Oleksandr Viktorovych Ihnatenko (born 17 April 1993) is a Ukrainian footballer who is last known to have played as a midfielder for Neftchi.

Career

Ihnatenko started his career with Ukrainian fifth division side ISTA.

In 2010, he signed for the reserves of Zorya in the Ukrainian top flight.

In 2015, Ihnatenko signed for Ukrainian fifth division club VPK-Ahro.

Before the second half of 2014/15, he signed for Sumy in the Ukrainian second division, where he made 51 appearances and scored 1 goal.

In 2017, Ihnatenko signed for Georgian second division team Zugdidi, where they suffered relegation to the Georgian third division.

Before the 2018 season, he signed for Neftchi in Kyrgyzstan.

References

External links
 
 

Ukrainian footballers
Living people
Expatriate footballers in Georgia (country)
Ukrainian expatriate footballers
Expatriate footballers in Kyrgyzstan
Erovnuli Liga 2 players
PFC Sumy players
Ukrainian First League players
FC Zugdidi players
Association football midfielders
1993 births
FC Zorya-2 Luhansk players